Ein HaNetziv (lit. Spring of the Netziv) is a kibbutz in the Beit She'an Valley in northern Israel. Belonging to the Religious Kibbutz Movement, it is located about three kilometers south of the ancient city of Beit She'an, 130 meters below sea level. It falls under the jurisdiction of Valley of Springs Regional Council.

Etymology
The name, translating to "Spring of (the) Netziv", comes from the springs found here, plus the initials of Rabbi Naftali Zvi Yehuda Berlin, the "Netziv of Volozhin" (1816 – 1893), who was one of the greatest rabbis of Russia at the end of the 19th century.

History

The kibbutz was established on 17 January 1946 on a site known in Arabic as "el-Wakwaka" by a group of young people of the Bnei Akiva Movement from Germany.

In the late 1960s, while preparing the lands for cultivation, members of the kibbutz discovered the Mosaic of Rehob among the ruins of an ancient synagogue.

Economy
The economy of the village today is based on agriculture (a herd of about a thousand cattle, extensive orchards of date palms and olive trees, cereal crops) and a plastics factory, Palziv, which exports all over the world.

Education
Within the kibbutz there are several educational establishments.
The Religious Kibbutz Movement's religious seminary for young women (Midreshet Kibbutz HaDati / מדרשת עין הנצי"ב) offers several programs: 
Torah study pre- and post sherut leumi; similar integration with military service; an overseas program; intensive training for "instructors  in halakha" (Jewish law).
The kibbutz also hosts an intensive study course or "ulpan" for French speakers wishing to convert to Judaism, which offers Hebrew language and Orthodox Judaism classes.

References 

Kibbutzim
Religious Kibbutz Movement
Populated places established in 1946
Populated places in Northern District (Israel)
1946 establishments in Mandatory Palestine
German-Jewish culture in Israel